This is a list of Croatian football transfers for the 2010 summer transfer window. Only moves featuring at least one Prva HNL club are listed.

Transfers

Dinamo Zagreb

In

Out

Summary
 Players in: 12
 Players out: 13
 Total expenditure: €2,350,000
 Domestic transfers: €250,000 (10,64%)
 International transfers: €2,100,000 (89,36%)
 Total income: €8,500,000
 Domestic transfers: €0
 International transfers: €8,500,000 (100,00%)
 Financial outcome:  €6,150,000

Hajduk Split

In

Out

References

External links
List of transfers at Nogometni magazin 

Croatian
2010
2010–11 in Croatian football
2009–10 in Croatian football